narodni was a Croatian radio station broadcast nationally which played exclusively domestic music. It was the most listened-to radio station in the country in 2014.

, it was one of three radio stations with national concessions, along with Otvoreni Radio and Croatian Catholic Radio.

The radio ceased broadcasting on 15 November 2022, and was replaced by bravo! radio on the next day.

Awards

2013 Porin Award as a "Friend of Croatian Music"

See also 
List of radio stations in Croatia

References

External links
Narodni radio

Radio stations in Croatia
Radio stations established in 1997
1997 establishments in Croatia